Pingyang County (Wenzhounese:ben yi) is a county in the prefecture-level city of Wenzhou, located along the southern coast of Zhejiang province, China.
There are two main cities with many surrounding villages in Pingyang. The two main settlements are called  and Kunyang (Kunyang is commonly called Pingyang, however Pingyang is also the name of the county).  Aojiang is located ten minutes outside of Kunyang and the various villages and area's that are also classified as part of Pingyang county extend for about a 1-hour radius.

Administrative divisions
Towns:
Kunyang (昆阳镇), Aojiang (鳌江镇), Shuitou (水头镇), Xiaojiang (萧江镇), Tengjiao (腾蛟镇), Wanquan (万全镇), Mabu (麻步镇), Shunxi (顺溪镇), Shanmen (山门镇), Nanya (南雁镇)

The only township is Qingjie She Ethnic Township (青街畲族乡)

Climate

Religious Persecution
Pingyang made international headlines in March 2017 when local Christian pastor, Huang Yizi was jailed for a year for protesting at the enforced removal of a cross from Pingyang's Salvation church. 50 people were arrested during the protest.

References

 
County-level divisions of Zhejiang
Geography of Wenzhou